Tonga A is a national representative rugby union team of the Tongan rugby union. It is the second-tier side to the Tonga national rugby union team. Tonga A competes in the Pacific Challenge, formerly known as the Pacific Rugby Cup, against teams including Samoa A and Fiji Warriors. Since 2017, the team has also competed in the Americas Pacific Challenge.

Between 2006 and 2010, Tonga was represented by two teams at the Pacific Rugby Cup; Tau'uta Reds and Tautahi Gold.

In 2010, Tonga A played three matches against other national A teams as an invited side to the Americas Rugby Championship. Earlier in that year Tonga A also played two matches against  in the first Punjas Series. The Tongans had one win and one loss but lost the series on aggregate scores. This result was repeated in the second (and concluding) Punjas Series in 2011.

The Pacific Rugby Cup was reorganised in 2011, and has since been mainly contested by national 'A' teams. The Tonga A side became the sole Tongan representative in the PRC from then on.

International matches
Matches against national teams or national 'A" teams up to and including 2014 Pacific Rugby Cup: 
{|style= "table-layout:fixed; width=95%; margin-top:0;margin-left:0;  border-width:1px;border-style:none ;border-color:#ddd; padding:0px; vertical-align:top;"
|-
 |16-04-2010 || (PS) ||align=right |  || 12–27 ||  ||National Stadium, Suva
|-
 |23-04-2010 || (PS) ||align=right |  || 21–3 ||  ||Churchill Park, Lautoka
|-
 |05-10-2010 ||(ARC) ||align=right |   || 6–17  ||  ||Estadio Olímpico Chateau Carreras
|-
 |10-10-2010 ||(ARC) || align=right |  || 16–32 ||  ||Estadio Olímpico Chateau Carreras
|-
 |15-10-2010 ||(ARC) || align=right |  || 28–10 ||  ||Estadio Olímpico Chateau Carreras
|-
 |19-03-2011 || (PRC) ||align=right | Fiji Warriors|| 21–14 ||  ||Churchill Park, Lautoka
|-
 |22-03-2011 || (PRC) ||align=right |  || 12–23 || Fiji Warriors ||Churchill Park, Lautoka
|-
 |13-08-2011 || (PS) ||align=right |  || 27–12 ||  ||Churchill Park, Lautoka
|-
 |19-08-2011 || (PS) ||align=right |  || 30–32 ||  ||Churchill Park, Lautoka
|-
 |11-10-2012 || (PRC)|| align=right |   || 18–20 ||  ||Teufaiva Stadium, Nuku'alofa
|-
 |19-10-2012 || (PRC)|| align=right |   || 16–25 || Fiji Warriors      ||Teufaiva Stadium, Nuku'alofa
|-
 |04-03-2014 || (PRC)|| align=right |   || 27–18 ||  ||TG Milner Field, Sydney
|-
 |19-03-2014 || (PRC)|| align=right | Pampas XV           || 47–20 ||  ||Royal Military College, Canberra
|}

Record

Season standings

Pacific Challenge (formerly Pacific Rugby Cup)
{| class="wikitable" style="text-align:center;"
|- border=1 cellpadding=5 cellspacing=0
! style="width:20px;"|Year
! style="width:20px;"|Pos
! style="width:20px;"|Pld
! style="width:20px;"|W
! style="width:20px;"|D
! style="width:20px;"|L
! style="width:25px;"|F
! style="width:25px;"|A
! style="width:25px;"|+/-
! style="width:20px;"|TB
! style="width:20px;"|LB
! style="width:20px;"|Pts
! style="width:20px;"|Final
! style="width:20em;" align=left|Notes
|- 
|align=left|2018
|rowspan=4 colspan=13 align=center| 
|- 
|align=left|2017
|- 
|align=left|2016
|- 
|align=left|2015
|- 
|align=left|2014
| 4th
| 4 || 2 || 0 || 2 || 96 ||115 || -19 || 1 || 0 ||  9
|  ||align=left|  Lost 3rd place play-off to Fiji Warriors
|-
|align=left|2013
| 4th
| 6 || 0 || 0 || 6 ||  73 || 306 ||-233 || 0 || 0 ||  0
| — ||align=left|
|-
|align=left|2012
| 3rd
| 8 || 1 || 1 || 6 || 72 || 253 ||-181 || 0 || 0 || 6
| — ||align=left|
|-
|-
|align=left|2011
| 3rd
| 8 || 2 || 1 || 5 || 133 || 233 ||-100 || 0 || 1 || 11
| — ||align=left|
|}

Americas Pacific Challenge
{| class="wikitable" style="text-align:center;"
|- border=1 cellpadding=5 cellspacing=0
! style="width:20px;"|Year
! style="width:20px;"|Pos
! style="width:20px;"|Pld
! style="width:20px;"|W
! style="width:20px;"|D
! style="width:20px;"|L
! style="width:25px;"|F
! style="width:25px;"|A
! style="width:25px;"|+/-
! style="width:20px;"|TB
! style="width:20px;"|LB
! style="width:20px;"|Pts
! style="width:20px;"|Final
! style="width:20em;" align=left|Notes
|-
|align=left|2018
|colspan=11 |
| — ||align=left|
|-
|align=left|2017
|3rd
| 3 || 2 || 0 || 1 ||  87 || 77 || +10 || 3 || 0 || 11
| — ||align=left| Third on league table (no final)
|}

References

External links
2014 Pacific Rugby Cup News on oceaniarugby.com

Tonga national rugby union team
Second national rugby union teams